Love Is Dead and We Killed Her is the second studio album by American pop punk band Doll Skin. It is the band's third recorded release, following 2015's In Your Face EP and their debut studio album Manic Pixie Dream Girl in 2017. The album was released on June 28, 2019. The first single from the album, "Mark My Words", was released on April 23, 2019.

In December 2019, Billboard ranked "Mark My Words" at #14 on their list of 'The 25 Best Rock & Alternative Songs of 2019'

Track listing 
All tracks are written by Doll Skin and Will McCoy except where noted.

Personnel 
Band
 Syd Dolezal – lead vocals, rhythm guitar
 Alex Snowden – lead guitar, backing vocals
 Nicole Rich – bass, backing vocals
 Meghan Herring – drums, backing vocalsTechnical Personnel'''
Will McCoy – production, mixing
Mike Green – executive producer
Alan Douches – mastering
Cath Connell – artwork and layout

Charts

References 

2019 albums
Hopeless Records albums
Pop punk albums by American artists